Egita (Egite) is a rural locality (a selo) in Yeravninsky District, Republic of Buryatia, Russia. The population was 342 as of 2010. There are 20 streets.

Geography 
Egita is located 60 km west of Sosnovo-Ozerskoye (the district's administrative centre) by road. Mozhayka is the nearest rural locality.

References 

Rural localities in Yeravninsky District